This is a list of the members of the Brussels Parliament, between 2004 and 2009.

Composition
The elections took place in 2004.

List of members

Sources
  - Only available in French and Dutch.

List
Parliament
2000s in Belgium